The 2015 Green Bay Blizzard season was the team's thirteenth season as a professional indoor football franchise and sixth in the Indoor Football League (IFL). One of ten teams competing in the IFL for the 2015 season, the Green Bay Blizzard were members of the United Conference. The team played their home games at the Resch Center in the Green Bay suburb of Ashwaubenon, Wisconsin.

Schedule
Key:

Regular season
All start times are local time

Standings

Roster

References

External links
Green Bay Blizzard official website
Green Bay Blizzard official statistics
Green Bay Blizzard at Green Bay Press-Gazette

Green Bay Blizzard seasons
Green Bay Blizzard
Green Bay Blizzard